Charles Adolf Gabrielsson (7 October 1884 – 16 April 1976) was a Swedish rower who competed in the 1912 Summer Olympics. Together with his younger brother Axel he was a crew member of the boat Göteborgs that was eliminated in the quarter finals of the coxed four, inriggers tournament. He was married to Elvira Davida, a woman two year his junior.

References

1884 births
1976 deaths
Swedish male rowers
Olympic rowers of Sweden
Rowers at the 1912 Summer Olympics
Sportspeople from Gothenburg